Carlos Alberto Gambarotta (7 December 1893 – 17 March 1944), known as Gamba, was a Brazilian footballer who played for Corinthians and Bahia. He was capped twice by the Brazil national football team in 1922, scoring two goals.

Career statistics

International

International goals
Scores and results list Brazil's goal tally first, score column indicates score after each Brazil goal.

Honours
Corinthians
Campeonato Paulista: 1922, 1923, 1924
Taça Competência: 1922

References

1893 births
1944 deaths
Brazilian footballers
Brazil international footballers
Association football forwards
Sport Club Corinthians Paulista players
Esporte Clube Bahia players